Kristján Jóhannsson (born 24 May 1948 in Akureyri, Iceland) is an Icelandic operatic tenor particularly known for his performances in Verdian roles, and especially as Radames in Aida.

Biography
Although Kristján was born into a musical family, he did not begin his musical studies until he was twenty years old, first at the College of Music in his native city under Sigurdur Demetz. He then went to Italy to pursue additional vocal training at the Conservatorio Nicolini in Piacenza under Gianni Poggi, as well as studying privately with Ettore Campogalliani and Ferruccio Tagliavini.

In 1980, Kristján Jóhannsson made his operatic debut in Osimo, Italy at the Teatro Piccolo la Fenice in Puccini´s  Il tabarro and Gianni Schicchi. He then went on to sing in leading opera houses around the world as well as at the Arena di Verona Apart from Verdian roles, his repertoire also includes the principal tenor roles in operas by Puccini, Leoncavallo, Wagner, Saint-Saëns, Mascagni, and Beethoven.

Major House debuts
1985 Cincinnati Opera, Zazà
1988 La Scala, I due Foscari
1989 Lyric Opera of Chicago, Tosca
1991 Vienna State Opera, Tosca
1993 New York Metropolitan Opera, Il trovatore 
1994 Royal Opera House, Covent Garden, Aida.

Recordings
Verdi: Aida (Maria Dragoni, Kristján Jóhannsson, Francesco Ellero d'Artegna, Barbara Dever, Mark Rucker, RTÉ National Symphony Orchestra; Rico Saccani, conductor). Naxos 8660033-34
Verdi: Aida (Kristján Jóhannsson, Maria Chiara, Dolora Zajick, Juan Pons, Carlo Strioli, Nicolaj Ghiuselev, Angelo Casertano, Anna Schiatti, Orchestra e Coro dell'Arena di Verona; Nello Santi, conductor) Fondazione Arena di Verona

Notes and sources

Turandot in the Forbidden City, Beijing, September 1998 Official web site
Verdi's Aida to debut in Beijing', People's Daily, September 23, 2003
Review: Il trovatore, Deutsche Oper Berlin, International Herald Tribune, April 3, 1996

External links
Kristjan Johannsson´s official web site
Lirica International Opera Management

Kristján Jóhannsson
Living people
1948 births
Kristján Jóhannsson
20th-century male opera singers